Xanthomatous biliary cirrhosis, is a condition in which there is hyperlipoproteinemia due to liver disease resulting in plane xanthomas.

See also 
 Skin lesion

References 

Skin conditions resulting from errors in metabolism